The 1947-48 Scottish Division C was won by East Stirlingshire who were promoted to the Division B. Raith Rovers 'A' finished bottom. It was the second season of short-lived Scottish Division C and featured seven reserve teams.

Table

References

Scottish Division Three seasons
3
Scot